The 2014 La Course by Le Tour de France was the inaugural edition of La Course by Le Tour de France, a one-day women's cycle race held in France. The race was run before the 21st stage of the 2014 Tour de France on 27 July.

The race was introduced following criticism by the professional women's peloton and campaigners such as Kathryn Bertine regarding the lack of a women's Tour de France.

Route and organisation 
The race was organised by the ASO and rated by the UCI as a 1.1 category race.

Broadcasting 
The race was covered in 157 countries by 25 TV broadcasters, 23 of which broadcast the last hour of the race live.

Teams
UCI Women's Teams

 Alé Cipollini
 Astana BePink Womens Team
 Bigla Pro Cycling Team
 Bizkaia–Durango
 Boels–Dolmans
 Estado de México–Faren Kuota
 Team Hitec Products
 Lotto–Belisol Ladies
 Optum p/b Kelly Benefit Strategies 
 Orica–AIS
 Poitou–Charentes.Futuroscope.86 
 Rabobank–Liv Woman Cycling Team
 RusVelo 
 Specialized–lululemon
 Team Giant–Shimano
 UnitedHealthcare
 Wiggle–Honda Pro Cycling

National teams

The race

The race started at 11:45 Central European Summer Time (UTC+2), and was scheduled to last until 13:00. The race saw many attacks. Dutchwomen Ellen van Dijk, who attacked multiple times, was the only women who was able to get clear for  a few laps with a maximal advantage of over half a minute. Besides of her also Anna van der Breggen, Annemiek van Vleuten (both ), Amy Pieters (Team Giant–Shimano), Chantal Blaak, Alena Amialiusik (Astana BePink) and Rachel Neylan (Australia National team) attempted to ride away from the peloton, but none were successful. With a few kilometres to go the Mexican national champion Ana Teresa Casas (Estado de México–Faren Kuota) crashed out of the race, and with around a kilometre to go another crash in the bunch took down Lizzie Armitstead (Boels–Dolmans) and Pauline Ferrand-Prévot (Rabo–Liv). The race ended in a bunch sprint with a peloton of about 30 riders. Marianne Vos (Rabo–Liv) won the sprint ahead of Kirsten Wild (Team Giant–Shimano). Canada's Leah Kirchmann (Optum p/b Kelly Benefit Strategies) finished third in the sprint.

Classifications
Besides the individual time classification (finishing time of the riders) there is a sprint and young rider classification. The Young rider classification exists of the individual time classification with riders born since 1 January 1992. The sprint classification is established by adding up the points obtained in each of the intermediate sprints. There were sprints after each of the first eleven laps, where 5, 4, 3, 2, and 1 point(s) were/was awarded to the top five riders.

Prize money
The total prize money of the race was €22,500: €17,500 was to be awarded to the best 20 riders of the individual time classification, €3,500 to the first 3 riders in the sprint classification and €2,000 to the first three riders of the young rider classification.

See also
 2014 in women's road cycling

References

External links 

 

2014 in women's road cycling
La Course by Le Tour de France
2014 in French sport